The Pines is an unincorporated community in Scott County, in the U.S. state of Arkansas.

History
According to tradition, this former logging town was named for the pine log cabins which once stood near the town site.

References

Unincorporated communities in Arkansas
Unincorporated communities in Scott County, Arkansas